airs on Fuji TV, premiering in March 2008. It is hosted by Shinya Ueda and Teppei Arita of Cream Stew; Fuji TV announcer Toshihiro Ito hosted the first 3 episodes. It is filmed in Tokyo, Japan.

Rules
Unlike most international versions, the value of each question is based on the number of correct answers, instead of the number of questions asked:
 The first 2 correct answers are each worth 10,000 yen, for a running total of 20,000 yen.
 The next 3 correct answers are each worth 20,000 yen, for a running total of 80,000 yen.
 The next 4 correct answers are each worth 30,000 yen, for a running total of 200,000 yen.
 Each subsequent correct answer is worth 50,000 yen, up to a maximum running total of 500,000 yen after 15 total correct answers.

The show uses video game-style "lives" instead of strikes; players start with three lives and lose one with each incorrect answer, and losing all three prompts the driver to pull over and kick the players out empty-handed.

Chances
Players are given three "Rescue Chances", which are the counterpart to the US and Canadian versions' "Shout-Outs":
 Asking Chance: The cab pulls over and players are given the opportunity to ask passers-by the question, much like the Street Shout-Out.
 Telephone Chance: Players may call a friend on a mobile phone, like the Mobile Shout-Out.
 Bookstore Chance: The cab pulls over in front of the nearest bookstore, and the players get to go inside and pick one book to buy, which they may then use to look up the answer. Players must pay for the book at their own expense.

At the end of the game, contestants are offered a "Double-Up Chance" similar to the US and Canadian versions' Video Bonus, where they may risk their winnings on a final double-or-nothing question. If the players opt to take the chance, they pick one of three envelopes, each containing a different question which may vary greatly in difficulty. Like international versions, correctly answering the question doubles the player's winnings, while failing to do so means the player leaves empty-handed.

References

Cash Cab
2008 Japanese television series debuts
Japanese game shows
2008 Japanese television series endings
Fuji TV original programming